Shahidul Alam Sachchu is a Bangladeshi film and television actor. He won Bangladesh National Film Award for Best Supporting Actor for his role in the film Britter Baire.

Career
Sachchu's stage of acting began with the stage play. He later starred in the drama and the film. His first film was Meghla Akash. Among his other films, Megher Pore Megh (2004), Bidrohi Padma (2006), Gangajatra (2009), Britter Baire (2009). General Manager (Program) at Channel i.

Works

Film

Telefilm

Single drama

References

External links
 

Living people
Bangladeshi male film actors
Bangladeshi male television actors
Best Performance in a Negative Role National Film Award (Bangladesh) winners
Year of birth missing (living people)